Kharrat Kola (also Romanized as Kharrāţ Kolā and Kharrāt Kolā) is a village in Talarpey Rural District, in the Central District of Simorgh County, Mazandaran Province, Iran. At the 2006 census, its population was 278, in 72 families.

References 

Populated places in Simorgh County